Darol Robert Anger is an American violinist and founding member of The David Grisman Quintet.

Career
Darol Anger entered popular music at the age of 21 as a founding member of The David Grisman Quintet. Anger played fiddle to David Grisman's mandolin in The David Grisman Quintet's (DGQ) 1977 debut. He co-founded and named the Turtle Island String Quartet with David Balakrishnan in 1985 and performed, composed, and arranged for the chamber jazz group. He frequently collaborates with fellow DGQ alumnus Mike Marshall.

Anger met pianist Barbara Higbie in Paris and formed a musical partnership with her. Together they released an early record on Windham Hill, Tideline (1982). Two years later, they formed a group called The Darol Anger/Barbara Higbie Quintet with Mike Marshall, Todd Phillips, and Andy Narell. This group performed at the 1984 Montreux Jazz Festival. The quintet later took the name Montreux. After two studio releases, the band broke up in 1990, and Anger continued with the Turtle Island String Quartet, founded in 1985. He still collaborates with Montreux and fellow Psychograss colleague, Mike Marshall, and occasionally also collaborates with Barbara Higbie and Michael Manring.

Using classical, folk, and jazz music as springboards, he currently leads Republic of Strings, founded with Scott Nygaard. He also co-founded The Duo (with Mike Marshall), Psychograss (the bluegrass group including Mike Marshall, mandolin; Todd Phillips, bass; David Grier, guitar; and Tony Trischka, banjo), Fiddlers 4 (with Michael Doucet, Bruce Molsky, violins; and Rushad Eggleston, cello), and Mr. Sun (with Joe Walsh, Grant Gordy, and Ethan Jodziewicz). Anger also plays frequently with pianist Phil Aaberg. He has performed or recorded with musicians ranging from Tony Rice, Stephane Grappelli and Mark O'Connor to Marin Alsop, Bill Evans, Nickel Creek, Chris Thile & Punch Brothers, Yonder Mountain String Band, Béla Fleck, Taarka and Anonymous 4. He can also be heard on the NPR's Car Talk theme song. He is a MacDowell and UCross Fellow.

Anger currently lives in Portland, Maine, after moving from his long-time home in the San Francisco Bay Area. He has completed the construction of 2 violins under the guidance of luthier Jonathan Cooper and was in 2010 named Associate Professor at the Berklee College of Music.

In June 2011 he began teaching online at the Online Fiddle School with Darol Anger, as part of the ArtistWorks Academy of Bluegrass.

He was the Artist at Large at the 2018 John Hartford Memorial Festival.

Discography 

 1979 Fiddlistics
 1982 Tideline – with Barbara Higbie
 1983 The Duo – with Mike Marshall
 1984 Live at Montreux '84
 1985 Jazz Violin Celebration
 1985 Chiaroscuro
 1987 Sign Language
 1989 Let Them Say
 1993 Psychograss
 1996 Heritage
 1997 At Home and on the Range
 1998 Christmas Heritage
 1997 Like Minds
 1999 Jam
 1999 Diary of a Fiddler
 2000 Brand New Can
 2001 Now Hear This
 2005 Republic of Strings
 2007 Generation Nation
 2007 Woodshop
 2007 Mike Marshall and Darol Anger with Väsen
 2008 Cross Time – with Philip Aaberg
 2014 Eand'a

Republic of Strings
 2004 Republic of Strings
 2006 Generation Nation

References

External links
Darol Anger (Official website)
Online Fiddle School with Darol Anger
ArtistWorks Academy of Bluegrass
Compass Records: Darol Anger (Artist page)

1953 births
Living people
Violinists from San Francisco
American bluegrass fiddlers
Progressive bluegrass musicians
New-age fiddlers
New-age violinists
Folk violinists
Folk fiddlers
Chamber jazz musicians
American jazz violinists
American male violinists
Windham Hill Records artists
Jazz musicians from San Francisco
Country musicians from California
21st-century American violinists
21st-century American male musicians
American male jazz musicians
David Grisman Quintet members
Montreux (band) members
Psychograss members
Turtle Island Quartet members
Compass Records artists
Rounder Records artists
Six Degrees Records artists